Ghibli (Italian: , also used in English), the name of a hot desert wind also known as sirocco, derived from Libyan Arabic.

Ghibli may refer to:

Vehicles
 Maserati Ghibli, a model of car made by Italian auto manufacturer Maserati
  Caproni Ca.309 Ghibli, a World War II-era aeroplane
 Ghibli, an AMX International AMX fighter aircraft
 Ghibli, an ultralight disc wheelset made by Italian bicycle parts manufacturer Campagnolo
 Ghibli, the radio callsign for the Italian airline Wind Jet

Other
 Studio Ghibli, a Japanese animation studio